Achille Vaarnold (born 26 January 1996) is a Dutch professional footballer who plays as a winger for De Volewijckers.

External links
 

1996 births
Living people
Dutch footballers
AZ Alkmaar players
Almere City FC players
AVV De Volewijckers players
Eredivisie players
Eerste Divisie players
Tweede Divisie players
Derde Divisie players
Sportspeople from Paramaribo
Surinamese emigrants to the Netherlands
Association football wingers